FK Dinamo Vranje is a football club based in Vranje, Serbia. They compete in the Pčinja District League, the fifth tier of the national league system.

History
After spending 12 consecutive seasons in the third tier, the club won the Serbian League East and took promotion to the Serbian First League in 2006. They thus reached the second tier for the first time in their history. However, the club was promptly relegated back to the third tier. They managed to win a second promotion to the Serbian First League in 2008. Over the next three years, the club competed in the second tier of Serbian football, before being relegated back to the Serbian League East in 2011.

After dropping to the Niš Zone League in 2013, the club was promoted back to the Serbian League East in 2014 and subsequently to the Serbian First League in 2015. They spent the following three years in the second tier, finishing runners-up in the 2017–18 season and gaining promotion to the Serbian SuperLiga for the first time in their history. However, the club failed to avoid relegation in its debut appearance in the top flight after losing to Inđija in the playoffs. They spent the next two seasons in the Serbian First League, before suffering relegation to the Serbian League East in 2021. In February 2022 during the winter break, the club withdrew from the league.

Honours
Serbian League East (Tier 3)
 2005–06, 2007–08, 2014–15

Seasons

Notable players
This is a list of players who have played at full international level.
  Admir Aganović
  Janko Simović
  Ostoja Stjepanović
  Dušan Petronijević
  Lazar Ranđelović
  Vojislav Stanković
  Nikola Stevanović
For a list of all FK Dinamo Vranje players with a Wikipedia article, see :Category:FK Dinamo Vranje players.

Managerial history

References

External links
 Club page at Srbijasport

1947 establishments in Serbia
Association football clubs established in 1947
Football clubs in Serbia
Vranje